Kuntur Wachanan (Quechua kuntur condor, wacha birth, to give birth, -na a suffix, 'where the condor is born', -n a suffix, also spelled Cóndorhuachanan) is a mountain in the Cordillera Central in the Andes of Peru which reaches a height of approximately . It is located in the Lima Region, Yauyos Province, Huancaya District.

References 

Mountains of Peru
Mountains of Lima Region